Pioneer Park is a public park in Salt Lake City's Rio Grande neighborhood, in the U.S. state of Utah. The site is listed on the National Register of Historic Places as Old Pioneer Fort Site.

Features include basketball and tennis courts, a dog park, a playground, and a multipurpose field. Pioneer Park also hosts the Downtown Farmers Market.

See also

 National Register of Historic Places listings in Salt Lake City

References

External links
 
 Pioneer Park at SLC.gov

National Register of Historic Places in Salt Lake City
Parks in Salt Lake City
Parks on the National Register of Historic Places in Utah